Al-Sadd SC, a Qatari professional association football club, has gained entry to Asian Football Confederation (AFC) competitions on several occasions. They have represented Qatar in the Champions League on nineteen occasions, the now-defunct Cup Winners' Cup four separate occasions and FIFA Club World Cup on two occasions.

History
In the 1989 season, they became the first Arab club side to triumph in the Asian Club Championship by defeating Al-Rasheed of Iraq on an aggregate of away goals. Twenty-two years later, they won the 2011 Asian Champions League and earned a spot in the 2011 FIFA Club World Cup, in which Al-Sadd finished third. They also earned a spot in the 2019 FIFA Club World Cup automatically as host club, in which Al-Sadd finished sixth.

AFC competitions

Asian Club Championship

Cup Winners' Cup

Champions League

Non-AFC competitions

Other competitions

FIFA Club World Cup

Afro-Asian Club Championship

Statistics

By season
Information correct as of 29 April 2021.
Key

Pld = Played
W = Games won
D = Games drawn
L = Games lost
F = Goals for
A = Goals against
Grp = Group stage

PR = Preliminary round
R1 = First round
R2 = Second round
PO = Play-off round
R16 = Round of 16
QF = Quarter-final
SF = Semi-final

Key to colours and symbols:

Overall record

In Asia
:

Non-AFC competitions
:

Statistics by country
Statistics correct as of game against Al-Nassr on April 29, 2021

AFC competitions

Non-AFC competitions

Asian competitions goals
Statistics correct as  March 7, 2023

Hat-tricks

Two goals one match

Non-AFC competitions goals

Notes

References

Asia
Al Sadd SC